The Beta-M is a radioisotope thermoelectric generator (RTG) that was used in Soviet-era lighthouses and beacons.

Design 
The Beta-M contains a core made up of strontium-90, which has a half-life of 28.79 years. The core is also known as radioisotope heat source 90 (RHS-90). In its initial state after manufacture, the generator is capable of generating 10 watts of electricity, almost enough to power a compact fluorescent light bulb with light output equivalent to a 60-watt bulb. Mass-scale production of RTGs in the Soviet Union was the responsibility of a plant called Baltiyets, in Narva, Estonia. The efficiency of thermal input (250 watts) to electric output (10 watts) at 4% is relatively high for an RTG of that era but low compared to larger scale thermal power conversion processes such as steam turbines which reach 30% and more efficiency.

Safety incidents 

Some Beta-M generators have been subject to incidents of vandalism when scavengers disassembled the units while searching for non-ferrous metals. In December 2001 a radiological accident occurred when three residents of Lia, Georgia found parts of an abandoned Beta-M in the forest while collecting firewood. The three suffered burns and symptoms of acute radiation syndrome as a result of their exposure to the strontium-90 contained in the Beta-M. The disposal team that removed the radiation sources consisted of 25 men who were restricted to 40 seconds' worth of exposure each while transferring the canisters to lead-lined drums.

References

External links 
 Norwegian environmental concerns over Beta-M generators still in use
RTG Master Plan Development Results and Priority Action Plan Elaboration for its Implementation

Electrical generators
Strontium
Nuclear technology in the Soviet Union
Energy in the Soviet Union